Rionda may refer to:

People with the surname
Bernie de la Rionda (born 1957), Cuban-born American attorney.
Luis Alberto Pérez-Rionda (born 1969), Cuban sprinter.
Manuel Rionda (1854-1943), Spanish-born, US-based sugar baron in Cuba.
Sasha Rionda (born 1977), Mexican actress.